The Way of the Warrior is an eight-part 1983 BBC documentary series about Asian martial arts. The series is narrated by Dennis Waterman.

Episodes
Shorinji Kempo: The New Way (11 May 1983)
Kalari: The Indian Way (18 May 1983)
Aikido and Kendo: The Sporting Way (25 May 1983)
T'ai Chi: The Soft Way (1 June 1983)
Eskrima: The Filipino Way (8 June 1983)
Karate: The Way of the Empty Hand (15 June 1983)
Kung Fu: The Hard Way (22 June 1983)
The Samurai Way (29 June 1983)

See also
Shorinji Kempo
Kalari
Aikido
Kendo
T'ai Chi
Eskrima
Karate
Kung Fu
The Way Of The Samurai - Iaijutsu)

BBC television documentaries
1983 in British television
Martial arts television series
1983 British television series debuts
1983 British television series endings
English-language television shows